Austria will compete at the 2011 World Aquatics Championships in Shanghai, China between July 16 and 31, 2011.

Diving

Austria has qualified 2 athletes in diving.

Men

Women

Swimming

Austria qualified 12 swimmers.

Men

Women

Synchronised swimming

Austria has qualified 2 athletes in synchronised swimming.

Women

References

Nations at the 2011 World Aquatics Championships
2011 in Austrian sport
Austria at the World Aquatics Championships